Rieul or Saint Rieul may refer to:

People
Saint Rieul of Senlis (died 260) bishop of Senlis
Saint Rieul of Reims (died 698) bishop of Reims
Roland Rieul (born 1906), French soldier and British spy

Geography
Saint-Rieul, a commune in Brittany, France
Church of Saint-Rieul, Brenouille, France
Tour Saint-Rieul, a tower at Church of Saint-Justin in Louvres (Val-d'Oise)

Language
Rieul (hangul), the Korean letter "ㄹ"